Highway 2000 is a highway system in Jamaica connecting Kingston, with Ocho Rios and a planned connection to Montego Bay, passing through the parishes of St. Catherine, Saint Ann, Clarendon and proposed sections through St. James, Saint Elizabeth, Westmoreland, Hanover. The highway is operated by the Jamaica Infrastructure Operators and developed by Trans-Jamaica Highway Limited through contractors CHEC and Bouygues Construction.

The highway is a four-to-six lane controlled-access, tolled motorway with grade-separated interchanges and intersections built according to modern international standards. Tolling of the highway is governed by a Tolling Policy.

The highway was built on a phased basis. Phases 1A and 1B are considered as the East-West Leg (T1) and Portmore Causeway (T2). Phase 2A is considered as the North-South Leg (T3).

On September 15, 2009, Jamaica's then  prime minister, Bruce Golding, announced to Parliament that Highway 2000 was to be renamed in honour of Usain Bolt, however, Bolt decided to reject the honour.

History
The Highway 2000 construction project was initialized by Government of Jamaica (former Prime Minister P.J. Patterson) in September 1999. The main objective of this project was to upgrade Jamaica's infrastructure, provide economic opportunities for growth and create jobs. The Project is a public-private partnership structured to maximize operational efficiency and minimize costs. The project is still ongoing, with the direct link to Montego Bay yet to be determined.

Notably, the intention of connecting Jamaica via such a comprehensive highway system, was first expressed and clearly defined in the Jamaican Transportation Survey of 1968/69; as a matter of fact, much of the current Highway 2000 alignments were proposed and defined therein, including the phase 1, East-West Leg and Portmore Causeway, phase 2, North-South Leg as well as a proposal to connect the East-West Leg to Montego Bay.  The proposed highway system was also included and adopted in the National Physical Plan for Jamaica 1970-90 with suggestions to have an alternate North-South Leg from May Pen to Discovery Bay as opposed to the one actually constructed (at present) from Caymanas to Ocho Rios. The NPP was a non-partisan Plan for Jamaica, first conducted under the United Nations Special Fund Project "Assistance in Physical Planning". The Plan was drafted by the then Town Planning Department (now NEPA) of the Ministry of Finance and Planning, Jamaica, and vetted by the then Prime Minister of Jamaica, the Most Honourable Hugh Lawson Shearer ON OJ PC, as well as the Minister of Finance and Planning, the Most Honourable Edward Philip George Seaga ON PC.

Phases
The project is divided into two phases, with the second phase being further divided into two.

Phase 1A (~46 km)
 Bushy Park to Sandy Bay (13 km)  - completed February 2004
 Kingston to Bushy Park (21 km)  - completed December 2004
 Portmore - Kingston Causeway (5 km)  - completed July 2006

Phase 1B (~37.7 km)
 Sandy Bay to May Pen (10.5 km) - completed August 15, 2012
 May Pen to Williamsfield— 69% complete (as of April 16, 2022) with  estimated completion by Late 2022-Early 2023

Phase 2A (~66 km)
The 66 km, Highway 2000 North-South Leg, has reduced travel time from Kingston to the North Coast town of Ocho Rios and the city of Montego Bay significantly. The construction took take place in 3 phases:

1. Mount Rosser Bypass (19.3 km) - completed August 5, 2014

2. Caymanas to Linstead (May 2013 to December 2015) - Opened March 2016

3. Moneague to Ocho Rios (June 2013 to December 2015) - Opened March 2016

Phase 2B
Williamsfield to Montego Bay—general alignment not yet clearly defined

Route Information

Saint Ann
The highway's North-South Leg begins in St. Ann at the Mammee Bay interchange which links T3 with the Northern Coastal Highway (which links Mammee Bay/Ocho Rios with Montego Bay). The highway cuts through the interior of the parish and has 2 additional interchanges (Lydford and Unity Valley) which have tolled on/off ramps and a rest stop at Unity Valley. The highway then transitions into St. Catherine.

Saint Catherine
The highway's North-South Leg and East-West Leg run through the parish of St. Catherine. The highway's significance is especially seen in the parish. The predecessor of the North-South Leg - T3 (Mammee Bay to Caymanas) was the A1, which involved passing through Mount Rosser, the Bog Walk Gorge and over The Flat Bridge. These areas were notorious for their particularly long travel times, in addition to the winding path through Mt. Rosser and the inaccessibility of the Bog Walk Gorge (which runs parallel to the Rio Cobre river) and Flat Bridge during adverse weather conditions. The highway bypasses these areas via the Mt. Rosser Bypass and the Linstead to Angels section of the highway and minimizes the total journey time from Kingston to Ocho Rios from over 2 hours to under an hour.

The East-West portion of the highway (T1) goes from the Vineyards Toll Booth (in the Parish) to Mineral Heights/Glenmuir road toll booth in Clarendon.

The T2 or Portmore Causeway goes from the parish of Kingston and into St. Catherine (more specifically, Portmore).

Kingston
The Highway's T2 leg called the Portmore Causeway begins on Marcus Garvey Drive and ends on Dawkins Drive (for northwest and southwest bound traffic) and Dyke Road (which carries traffic North and links the causeway with T1 by circumnavigating the periphery of the heavily populated Kingston conurbation of Portmore).

Saint Andrew
Though the highway has no formal presence in the parish of St. Andrew, the Washington Boulevard leads onto Mandela Highway and vice versa - after the interchange leading to either New Kingston (Uptown, located in St. Andrew) or Downtown & the Airport (located in Kingston Parish). Mandela Highway has on and off ramps to all sections of the highway.

Clarendon 
TBD

Manchester 
TBD

St. James 
TBD

References 

 JIO
  China Harbour Engineering Company (Latin America)

Roads in Jamaica